Eric H. Coyle (born October 26, 1963) is a former American football center in the National Football League for the Washington Redskins.  He played college football at the University of Colorado.

1963 births
Living people
People from Longmont, Colorado
American football centers
Colorado Buffaloes football players
Washington Redskins players
National Football League replacement players